Beal may refer to:

Places

United Kingdom 
Beal, Northumberland, England
Beal, North Yorkshire, England

United States 
 Beal, California
Beal, Indiana
Beal, Missouri
Beal City, Michigan

Other uses
Beal (surname)
Beal Aerospace, a launch vehicle development company
Beal Bank, Plano, Texas
Beal College, Bangor, Maine
River Beal, a small river in Greater Manchester, England
H.B. Beal Secondary School, a high school in London, Ontario
Chicken Beal, Aboriginal Cuisine

See also
Beale (disambiguation)
Beall, a surname
Beals (disambiguation)
Beel (disambiguation)
Bheel (disambiguation)
Biel (disambiguation)